Elmar Tepp (30 April 1913 – 11 May 1943) was an Estonian footballer. He played in 16 matches for the Estonia national football team from 1937 to 1940. He was also named in Estonia's squad for the Group 1 qualification tournament for the 1938 FIFA World Cup.

Tepp was conscripted into the Red Army in 1941 and became a prisoner of war of the Germans during the Battle of Velikiye Luki along with teammates Heinrich Uukkivi and Richard Kuremaa. He was released in a later Soviet advance and subsequently sentenced to death by Soviet authorities, which was later commuted to a fifteen-year prison sentence. He died in prison in Kalinin, Russia in 1943.

References

External links
 

1913 births
1943 deaths
Estonian footballers
Estonia international footballers
Association football defenders
Footballers from Tallinn
Estonian people who died in Soviet detention
People who died in the Gulag
Estonian prisoners sentenced to death
Prisoners sentenced to death by the Soviet Union
Soviet military personnel of World War II
Estonian prisoners of war
World War II prisoners of war held by Germany